Azteca brevicornis is a species of ant in the genus Azteca. Described by Mayr in 1878, the species is endemic to Brazil.

References

Azteca (genus)
Hymenoptera of South America
Insects described in 1878